Paul Mandelstamm (– 1941) was a Baltic German-Jewish architect, working mainly in present-day Latvia.

Biography
Paul Mandelstamm was born in Kovno Governorate in present-day Lithuania (then part of the Russian Empire). He studied both architecture and civil engineering at Riga Polytechnic Institute (today Riga Technical University) and graduated in 1892. He worked on the construction of the first electric tram line in Riga in 1900–1901, and supervised the construction of waterworks in the city in 1903–1904. He furthermore designed more than 50 buildings in the city, from the beginning in an Eclectic style, but later in Art Nouveau and later still in a Functionalist style.

He was a victim of Holocaust and was shot in the Riga Central Prison in 1941, during the German occupation of Latvia during World War II.

Examples of buildings by Paul Mandelstamm

References

Further reading
 Berkovich, Gary. Reclaiming a History. Jewish Architects in Imperial Russia and the USSR. Volume 1. Late Imperial Russia: 1891–1917. Weimar und Rostock: Grunberg Verlag. 2021. p. 141. .

Architects from Riga
1872 births
1941 deaths
Art Nouveau architects
Riga Technical University alumni
People from Žagarė
Latvian Jews who died in the Holocaust